Cuajone Botiflaca Airport  is a high elevation airport serving the mining town of Cuajone (es) in the Moquegua Region of Peru.

See also

Transport in Peru
List of airports in Peru

References

External links
SkyVector - Cuajone

Airports in Peru
Buildings and structures in Moquegua Region